Aleksander Kahane (born 30 May 1906, date of death unknown) was a Polish footballer. He played in three matches for the Poland national football team from 1926 to 1927.

References

External links
 

1906 births
Year of death missing
Polish footballers
Poland international footballers
Association footballers not categorized by position